The GIGN is the elite police tactical unit of the National Gendarmerie of France. Among its missions are counterterrorism, hostage rescue, surveillance of national threats, protection of government officials, critical site protection (such as French embassies in war-torn countries), and targeting organized crime.

Established in 1973, the GIGN was initially created as a relatively small tactical unit specialized in sensitive hostage situations, but has since grown into a larger force with expanded responsibilities and capabilities. It is now composed of nearly 1,000 operators: around 400 operators based in Satory, near Versailles in the Paris area and approximately 600 operators in fourteen regional GIGN branches, AGIGN, located in metropolitan France or in the French overseas territories. The unit shares jurisdiction of French sovereign territory with the special response units of the National Police, and its training centre is located in Beynes.

Although most of its operations take place in France, the GIGN (as a component of the French Armed Forces) can operate anywhere in the world. Many of its missions are secret, and GIGN operators are not allowed to be publicly photographed. Since its formation, the GIGN has been involved in over 1,800 missions and has also rescued more than 600 hostages, making it one of the most experienced counter-terrorism units in the world.

In December 1994, the GIGN rose to worldwide prominence after its operatives successfully stormed Air France Flight 8969, which had been hijacked by the Armed Islamic Group of Algeria at Marseille Provence Airport; all four hijackers were killed in the assault.

History

Initially named ECRI ( or Regional Commando Intervention Team), it became operational in March 1974, under the command of then-lieutenant , and executed its first mission ten days later. GIGNs initial complement was 15, later increased to 32 in 1976, 78 by 1986, and 120 by 2005.

In 1984, it became a part of a larger organisation called GSIGN,  together with EPIGN, GSPR, the Presidential Security group and GISA, a specialized training center.

On 1 September 2007, a major reorganization took place. GSIGN was disbanded and replaced by a new unit also named GIGN. The former GSIGN components (the original GIGN, EPIGN, GSPR and GISA) became "forces" of the new GIGN which now reached a total complement of 380 operators.

The change from GSIGN to the new GIGN, an organization reporting directly to the Director-general of the Gendarmerie, was not a simple name swap. It was done in order to reinforce command and control functions; provide better integration through common selection, common training and stronger support; and improve the unit's capability to handle complex situations such as mass hostage-takings similar to the Beslan school siege. 

In 2009, the Gendarmerie, while remaining part of the French Armed Forces, was attached to the Ministry of the Interior, which already supervised the National Police. The respective areas of responsibility of each force did not change however, as the Police already had primary responsibility for major cities and large urban areas, while the Gendarmerie was in charge of smaller towns and rural areas (in addition to its specific military missions). Under the new command structure, GIGN gendarmes can still be engaged in operations outside of France due to their military status.

Since its creation, the group has taken part in over 1,800 operations, rescued over 600 hostages and arrested over 1500 suspects, losing two members killed in action and seven in training. The two fatalities in action were sustained when dealing with armed deranged persons.

In January 2015, GIGN was engaged for the very first time simultaneously with RAID, the National Police tactical unit, during the January 2015 Île-de-France attacks.

On 1 August 2021, the 14 regional GIGN branches were fully integrated in the group's organization as part of a new Force Antennes. Prior to this reorganization, these regional branches, established in 2004, had been administratively attached to the seven domestic "Zonal Gendarmerie Regions" for seven of them and to the Overseas Gendarmerie Command for the remaining seven but they were independent units that only came under GIGN operational control when a crisis occurred. Sometimes referred to as "GIGN 3.0", the new organization also emphasizes the group's role in training and in operational support.

A new common insignia was adopted as a result of the 2021 reorganization. Shaped as a shield, it worn on the left sleeve by every GIGN gendarme. A circular badge is worn on the right sleeve: the traditional round GIGN patch for Satory-based operators and a different patch for members of the AGIGNs. The AGIGN patch replaces the parachute with a thunderbolt, as AGIGNs are not parachute units.

Structure
 
GIGN is currently organized in four "forces", a "détachement", an Engineering and Support division, a National Training Center for Specialized Intervention and a Human Resources bureau, under two headquarters (administrative and operational):
 Intervention Force ( – the original GIGN): Approximately 100 operators, serving as GIGN's main assault unit. It is divided into four sections (platoons), two of which are on alert at all times. These sections are further divided into individual teams of operators. Two of the intervention sections specialize in high altitude jumps; the other two specialize in diving.
 Observation & Search Force: Approximately 40 operators, specializing in reconnaissance in relation with judiciary police work, and counterterrorism. Formed from the EPIGN.
 Security & Protection Force: Approximately 65 operators, specializing in executive and sensitive site protection. Formed from the EPIGN.
 Regional Branches Force: Headquarters for the fourteen regional GIGN branches.
 Gendarmerie Detachment of the GSPR Presidential Security Group: Tasked with protecting the President of France. Originally a Gendarmerie unit, GSPR (Groupe de Sécurité de la Présidence de la République) is now jointly operated by the Gendarmerie and the National Police.
 Engineering and Support Division: A support force with cells specializing in long-range sniping, breaching, assault engineering, special devices, and other specializations.
 National Training Center for Specialized Intervention: Tasked with selection, training and retraining (called recycling) not only of GIGN operators, but also of selected Gendarmerie or foreign personnel.

Female gendarmes are admitted in all forces, except the Intervention Force.

There are several tactical specialties in the group, including: long-range sniping, breaching, observation and reconnaissance, executive protection, freefall parachuting with HALO/HAHO jumps, diving, etc.

Helicopter support is provided by Gendarmerie helicopters and, for tactical deployment of large groups, by GIH, a joint Army/Air Force special operations flight equipped with SA330 PUMA helicopters, based in nearby Villacoublay Air Base. GIH was established in 2006, and has also been tasked to support the National Police's RAID unit since 2008.

The fourteen regional GIGN branches, initially known as PI2Gs for the domestic units and GPIs for the overseas units, were respectively redesignated as GIGN branches in April and July 2016 and fully integrated into GIGN in 2021. As of 2021, the seven metropolitan GIGN branches are located in Caen, Dijon, Nantes, Orange, Reims, Toulouse and Tours, while the seven overseas branches are based in Guadeloupe, Martinique, French Guiana, Réunion, Mayotte, French Polynesia and New Caledonia. The twenty nuclear protection units, called PSPGs, located on site at each one of the French nuclear power plants, are not a part of GIGN, but operate under its operational control.

Coordination between GIGN and RAID, the National Police's tactical unit, is handled by a joint organization called Ucofi ( or Intervention Forces Coordination Unit). A "leader/follower" protocol has been established for use when both units need to be engaged jointly, leadership belonging to the unit operating in its primary areas of responsibility.

Operations

GIGN reports directly to the Director General of the Gendarmerie Nationale (DGGN), i.e., the chief of staff of the Gendarmerie, who in turn reports directly to the Ministry of the Interior. The DGGN or his Deputy for Operations can take charge in a major crisis; however, most of the day-to-day missions are conducted in support of local units of the Departmental Gendarmerie. GIGN is also a member of the European ATLAS Network, an informal association consisting of the special police units of the 27 states of the European Union.

Known GIGN operations include:
 Rescue of 30 French pupils from a school bus captured by the Front de Libération de la Côte des Somalis in Loyada, Djibouti in 1976. GIGN snipers and French Foreign Legion troops killed the hostage-takers in an operation that was only partially successful, as two children were killed.
 Planning the rescue of diplomats from the French Embassy in San Salvador in 1979; the hostage-takers surrendered before the assault was conducted.
 Advising Saudi authorities during the Grand Mosque Seizure in Mecca, Saudi Arabia, in November and December 1979.
 Arrest of several Corsican terrorists of the National Liberation Front of Corsica at the Fesch Hostel in 1980.
 Arrest of suspected Irish terrorists in the Irish of Vincennes affair, in August 1982.
 Rescue of hostages during the Ouvéa cave hostage taking in Ouvea, New Caledonia in May 1988.
 Protection of the 1992 Olympic Winter Games in Albertville.
 Rescue of 229 passengers and crew from Air France Flight 8969 in Marseille in December 1994. Nine GIGN operators were wounded during the operation, but all four hijackers were killed. The mission was broadcast live by news channels, increasing awareness of GIGN's existence.
 Arrest of the mercenary Bob Denard and his group during a coup attempt in 1995 in Comoros (Operation Azalee).
 Operations in Bosnia to arrest persons indicted for war crimes.
 Capture of 6 Somali pirates, and recovery of part of the ransom, after ensuring that Le Ponant luxury yacht hostages were freed off the coast of Puntland, Somalia in the Gulf of Aden, in conjunction with French Commandos Marine in April 2008.
 Deployment of tactical teams in Afghanistan in support of French Gendarmerie POMLT (Police Operational Mentoring Liaison Team) detachments from 2009 to 2011.
 Deployment in Libya during Operation Harmattan in 2011.
 Neutralization of the two terrorists involved in the Paris Charlie Hebdo shooting on 7 January 2015.
 Deployment to the 2015 Bamako hotel attack, although the situation had already been taken care of by local police, with assistance from American and French special forces, by the time the GIGN team arrived.
 Neutralization of the terrorist responsible for the Carcassonne and Trèbes attack in March 2018 (a former EPIGN officer, Arnaud Beltrame, voluntarily swapped places with a hostage and was killed trying to disarm the terrorist). This operation was conducted by an AGIGN unit based in Toulouse under GIGN supervision, while operatives sent from Satory were still underway.
 Several deployments in Ukraine in 2022 to protect various French or International missions during the Russian invasion.
GIGN was selected by the International Civil Aviation Organisation (ICAO) to organise hostage-rescue exercises aboard planes for the special forces of the other member states.

Selection and training 

Candidates undertake a one-week pre-selection screening followed by, for those accepted, a fourteen-month training program. Mental ability and self-control are important, in addition to physical strength. Similar to most special forces, the training is stressful with a high rate of failure, especially in the initial phase; only 7–8% of the volunteers complete the training process. AGIGN candidates undertake a one-week pre-selection screening followed by an eight-week training program. 

GIGN training consists of:
 Weapon handling
 Combat shooting and marksmanship training
 Airborne courses, such as HALO or HAHO jumps, paragliding, and heliborne insertions
 Underwater combat, swimming, diving, and naval boarding
 Hand-to-hand combat training
 Undercover surveillance and stalking (investigative cases support)
 Infiltration and escape techniques
 Explosive ordnance disposal
 Chemical, biological, radiological, and nuclear device neutralization
 Survival and warfare in tropical, arctic, mountain and desert environments
 Diplomacy and negotiation skills

The GIGN trains alongside other counterterrorist units from NATO countries, including the American FBI HRT, British SAS, Australian SPS, German GSG 9, and Irish Garda ERU.

Weapons and equipment

GIGN uses a wide range of firearms and equipment, including:
 Sidearms: 
 Pistols: Glock 17/19/26, SIG Sauer SP 2022 
 Revolvers: Manurhin MR 73, Smith & Wesson Model 686
 Submachine guns: HK MP5, HK MP7, FN P90
 Shotguns: Remington Model 870, Franchi SPAS-12, Benelli M4
 Assault rifles: HK416, HK417, HK G36, SIG SG 550 and variants, CZ BREN 2, FAMAS (ceremonially)
 Sniper rifles: Accuracy International Arctic Warfare in .308 and .338, PGM Hécate II in 12.7x99mm
 Ballistic shields
 Various types of armored vehicles, both civilian-style SUVs and dedicated armoured personnel carriers, some with assault ladders installed on the roof of the vehicle
 Various types of helicopter

Motto and values 
 Until 2014:  ("To save lives without regard to one's own")
 Since 2014:   ("A commitment for life")

Although GIGN, as part of the French military, has been deployed to external combat zones, it is primarily centered in France, engaging in peacetime operations as a special police force. Respect for human life, combined with fire discipline, has always been taught to group members since its inception. Each new member is traditionally issued a six-shot revolver as a reminder of these values.

GIGN leaders
 Chef d'escadron Christian Prouteau: 1973–1982
 Capitaine Paul Barril: 1982–1983 (Interim)
 Capitaine Philippe Masselin: 1983–1985
 Chef d'escadron Philippe Legorjus: 1985–1989
 Chef d'escadron Lionel Chesneau: 1989–1992
 Chef d'escadron Denis Favier: 1992–1997
 Chef d'escadron Eric Gerard: 1997–2002
 Lieutenant Colonel Frédéric Gallois: 2002-2007
 Général de Brigade Denis Favier: 2007–2011
 Général de Brigade Thierry Orosco: 2011–2014
 Général de Brigade Hubert Bonneau: 2014–2017
 Général de Brigade Laurent Phélip: 2017–2020
 Général de Division Ghislain Réty: since August 2020

Awards 
On 9 December 2011, French Defense Minister Gérard Longuet, awarded the Cross for Military Valour to GIGN for its participation in operation Harmattan in Libya. On 31 July 2013, GIGN was awarded a second Cross for Military Valour for its participation in the War in Afghanistan.

On 15 June 2015, the unit received the Medal for internal security. As GIGN was awarded the Cross for Military Valour twice, members of the group are officially allowed to wear the fourragère.

In popular culture 

GIGN has been featured in dozens of media works, including films, television shows, novels, video games, and strip cartoons, typically working alongside other international counterterrorist units. They have also been the focus of several works, including:

L'Assaut, a 2010 French film about the Air France Flight 8969 hijacking. It was done with the collaboration and the advice of GIGN. There are a few fictional personal stories intertwined with the operation, but otherwise, the film is accurate to reports of the operation.
L'Ordre et la Morale (Rebellion), a 2011 film depicting the controversial 1988 Ouvéa cave hostage taking in New Caledonia, from the perspective of then-GIGN leader Philippe Legorjus. Even though he played a major role in the negotiations, and participated in the first part of the assault, Legorjus' leadership during and after the operation was contested, and he left GIGN a few months later.
L'intervention (15 Minutes of War), a 2019 French-Belgian very loosely based on GIGN's 1976 hostage rescue of school children in Djibouti.

Gallery

See also
 Law enforcement in France
 List of police tactical units
 ATLAS Network
 RAID
 Research and Intervention Brigade

References

Footnotes

Bibliography

External links

 GIGN page on the Gendarmerie Nationale's Official webpage 
 GIGN, 40 ans d'assauts (French documentary)

1973 establishments in France
 
Counterterrorist organizations
French Gendarmerie
Specialist law enforcement agencies of France